Ron Anderson, Jr. (born September 12, 1989) is American professional basketball player who formerly played for ABBR Opale Sud of the Championnat de France de basketball de Nationale masculine 1 (NM1), the third tier of French basketball. He is the son of former NBA player Ron Anderson.

High school career 
Anderson attended McCallie School in Chattanooga, Tennessee. As a senior, he averaged 15.1 points, 11.6 rebounds and 2.8 blocks per game while helping the Blue Tornadoes to a school-record 24–5 overall mark and an appearance in the semifinals of the Division II State Tournament.

College career

South Florida
In 2009, Anderson transferred to South Florida and subsequently sat out the 2009–10 season due to NCAA transfer rules.

In his redshirted junior season, his 6.4 rebounds and 2.4 offensive rebounds was 14th and 10th in the BIG EAST respectively. He was also fifth on the team in scoring at 7.0 points per game.

In his senior season, he played 36 games, averaging 6.9 points, 5.5 rebounds and 1.1 assists per game.

Professional career
Anderson went undrafted in the 2012 NBA draft. On November 2, 2012, he was selected in the fourth round of the 2012 NBA D-League draft by the Tulsa 66ers.

In July 2013, he joined the Oklahoma City Thunder for the 2013 NBA Summer League. In October 2013, he joined Estudiantes Concordia of Argentina for the 2013–14 season. In December 2013, he left Estudiantes after 16 games. On December 19, 2013, he was re-acquired by the Tulsa 66ers.

In July 2014, he re-joined the Oklahoma City Thunder for the 2014 NBA Summer League. On November 4, 2014, he was acquired by the Oklahoma City Blue. On December 26, 2014, he was traded to the Westchester Knicks in exchange for a 2015 third-round pick. On February 17, 2015, he was released by the Knicks. On March 22 he was acquired by the Texas Legends.

On July 31, 2015, Anderson signed with ABBR Opale Sud.

The Basketball Tournament
In 2017, Anderson played for the Tampa Bulls of The Basketball Tournament. Anderson's team made it to the Sweet 16 before they were defeated by eventual tournament champ, Overseas Elite. Anderson averaged 6.7 PPG and 5.3 RPG for the tournament.

References

External links
USF bio
NBA D-League profile

1989 births
Living people
American expatriate basketball people in Argentina
American expatriate basketball people in France
American men's basketball players
Basketball players from Maryland
Berck Basket Club players
Estudiantes Concordia basketball players
Kansas State Wildcats men's basketball players
Oklahoma City Blue players
People from Upper Marlboro, Maryland
Poitiers Basket 86 players
South Florida Bulls men's basketball players
Sportspeople from the Washington metropolitan area
Texas Legends players
Tulsa 66ers players
Westchester Knicks players
Forwards (basketball)